The Governors Awards presentation is an annual award ceremony hosted by the Academy of Motion Picture Arts and Sciences (AMPAS), at the Grand Ballroom of the Hollywood and Highland Center, in the Hollywood district of Los Angeles, California. Three awards that signify lifetime achievement within the film industry – the Academy Honorary Award, the Jean Hersholt Humanitarian Award, and the Irving G. Thalberg Memorial Award – are presented at this ceremony. The first Governors Awards ceremony was held on November 14, 2009. Prior to this, these three awards were formally presented during the main Academy Awards ceremony, which now conducts a short mention and appearance of the awards recipients after displaying a montage of the Governors Awards presentation. In the years since, the awards have gained prominence as a major red-carpet destination and industry event.

Description and history 

The Governors Awards are one of five award ceremonies hosted by AMPAS, along with the Academy Scientific and Technical Awards, Academy Student Academy Awards, the Nicholl Fellowships in Screenwriting, and the main Oscars.

The Academy Honorary Award (every year), Jean Hersholt Humanitarian Award (some years), and Irving G. Thalberg Memorial Award (some years) are presented at the ceremony. The Governors Awards are held the November or December before the main Academy Awards ceremony, usually held in February or March the following year. The Awards are not voted upon but, rather, are presented at the discretion of the Academy.

The Academy Honorary Awards and Jean Hersholt Humanitarian Awards are both Oscar statuettes, while the Irving G. Thalberg Memorial Award is a small bust of Thalberg on a plinth.

The Academy Honorary Award is given for "extraordinary distinction in lifetime achievement, exceptional contributions to the state of motion picture arts and sciences, or for outstanding service to the Academy".  The Thalberg Award is given to "a creative producer whose body of work reflects a consistently high quality of motion picture production".

The board members of AMPAS had previously been concerned about awarding more than one or two Honorary Academy Awards each year for fear of lengthening the main Academy Awards presentation but, in most iterations of the Governors Awards to date, they have awarded three Honorary Academy Awards. So far in the history of the Governors Awards, the Hersholt Award and the Thalberg Award have always been given on separate years.

The smaller presentation of the Governors Awards was designed to invoke the feel of the early Academy Award ceremonies. During the event, several notable colleagues of the awardees give them tributes before they make an acceptance speech. Though the event has not been televised, thus far, the Academy posted most of the speeches for the 2013 and 2014 events online.

Since its inception, the event has become a major red-carpet stop for many prospective Oscar hopefuls, including actors and filmmakers, and is, in some ways, the first major stop of the seasonal Awards Circuit.

Ceremonies and honorees

1st Annual Governors Awards 

The Academy held its 1st Annual Governors Awards ceremony on November 14, 2009.  The following awards were presented.

 Academy Honorary Award: Lauren Bacall, Roger Corman, and Gordon Willis
 Irving G. Thalberg Memorial Award: John Calley

2nd Annual Governors Awards 

The Academy held its 2nd Annual Governors Awards ceremony on November 13, 2010.  The following awards were presented.

 Academy Honorary Award: Kevin Brownlow, Jean-Luc Godard, and Eli Wallach
 Irving G. Thalberg Memorial Award: Francis Ford Coppola

3rd Annual Governors Awards 

The Academy held its 3rd Annual Governors Awards ceremony on November 12, 2011.  The following awards were presented.

 Academy Honorary Award: James Earl Jones and Dick Smith
 Jean Hersholt Humanitarian Award: Oprah Winfrey

4th Annual Governors Awards 

The Academy held its 4th Annual Governors Awards ceremony on December 1, 2012.  The following awards were presented.

 Academy Honorary Award: D. A. Pennebaker, Hal Needham and George Stevens Jr.
 Jean Hersholt Humanitarian Award: Jeffrey Katzenberg

5th Annual Governors Awards 

The Academy held its 5th Annual Governors Awards ceremony on November 16, 2013. The following awards were presented.

 Academy Honorary Award: Angela Lansbury, Steve Martin and Piero Tosi
 Jean Hersholt Humanitarian Award: Angelina Jolie

6th Annual Governors Awards 

The Academy held its 6th Annual Governors Awards ceremony on November 8, 2014. The following awards were presented.

 Academy Honorary Award: Jean-Claude Carrière, Hayao Miyazaki, and Maureen O'Hara
 Jean Hersholt Humanitarian Award: Harry Belafonte

7th Annual Governors Awards 

The Academy held its 7th Annual Governors Awards ceremony on November 14, 2015. Academy president Cheryl Boone Isaacs gave a speech in support of France following the November 2015 Paris attacks the day before. The following awards were presented.

 Academy Honorary Award: Spike Lee and Gena Rowlands
 Jean Hersholt Humanitarian Award: Debbie Reynolds (who was not able to attend; her granddaughter Billie Lourd accepted on her behalf)

8th Annual Governors Awards 

The Academy held its 8th Annual Governors Awards ceremony on November 12, 2016, and presented the following awards:

 Academy Honorary Award: Jackie Chan, Anne V. Coates, Lynn Stalmaster and Frederick Wiseman

9th Annual Governors Awards 

The Academy held its 9th Annual Governors Awards ceremony on November 11, 2017, and presented the following awards:

 Academy Honorary Award: Agnès Varda, Charles Burnett, Donald Sutherland and Owen Roizman

10th Annual Governors Awards 

The Academy held its 10th Annual Governors Awards ceremony on November 18, 2018, and presented the following awards:

 Academy Honorary Award: Cicely Tyson, Lalo Schifrin and Marvin Levy
 Irving G. Thalberg Memorial Award: Kathleen Kennedy and Frank Marshall

11th Annual Governors Awards 

The Academy held its 11th Annual Governors Awards ceremony on October 27, 2019, and presented the following awards:

 Academy Honorary Award: David Lynch, Wes Studi, and Lina Wertmüller
 Jean Hersholt Humanitarian Award: Geena Davis

12th Annual Governors Awards 
The Academy held its 12th Annual Governors Awards ceremony in on March 25, 2022. The following awards were presented:

 Academy Honorary Award: Samuel L. Jackson, Elaine May, and Liv Ullmann
 Jean Hersholt Humanitarian Award: Danny Glover

On December 22, 2021, the AMPAS announced that due to COVID-19 pandemic-related concerns—involving the widespread surge of the Omicron variant in the United States—that it "made the decision to change plans for hosting the ceremony in person on January 15, 2022," with a new date to be announced. The ceremony would afterwards be held on the newly scheduled date of March 25, 2022.

13th Annual Governors Awards 
The Academy held its 13th Annual Governors Awards ceremony on November 19, 2022.

 Academy Honorary Award: Peter Weir, Diane Warren and Euzhan Palcy
 Jean Hersholt Humanitarian Award: Michael J. Fox

Associated events 
 Academy Awards (February or March)
 Academy Scientific and Technical Awards (about two weeks before the Academy Awards ceremony)
 Academy Student Academy Awards
 Nicholl Fellowships in Screenwriting

References

External links 
 

2009 establishments in California
Academy of Motion Picture Arts and Sciences
Awards established in 2009